The Aquila 27 is a French sailboat that was designed by Philippe Harlé, as a cruiser-racer and first built in 1975.

Production
The design was built by Jeanneau in France, from 1975 until 1984, with 1048 boats completed.

Design
The Aquila 27 is a recreational keelboat, built predominantly of fiberglass, with wood trim. It has a masthead sloop rig, with a deck-stepped mast and aluminum spars with stainless steel wire rigging. The hull has a raked stem, a reverse transom, a skeg-mounted rudder controlled by a tiller and a fixed fin keel or shoal draft keel.

The design has sleeping accommodation for five people, with a double "V"-berth in the bow cabin, two straight settee berths and one pilot berth in the main cabin around a drop leaf table. The galley is located on the port side just forward of the companionway ladder. The galley is "U"-shaped and is equipped with a two-burner stove. The head is located opposite the galley on the starboard side.

Variants
Aquila 27 Standard (Shoal Draft)
This cruising-oriented model displaces  empty and carries  of iron ballast. The mast has one set of spreaders.
Aquila 27 Regatta (Sport)
This lightened racing-oriented model displaces  empty and carries  of lead ballast. The mast has two sets of spreaders.

See also
List of sailing boat types

References

External links
 (contains data errors)
 Photo of an Aquila 27 Standard

Keelboats
1970s sailboat type designs
Sailing yachts
Sailboat type designs by Philippe Harlé
Sailboat types built by Jeanneau